Otero de Sanabria is a village located in Sanabria, province of Zamora, Castile and León, Spain. According to the 2020 census (INE), the village had a population of 24 inhabitants.

Since 2021 it has been one of the few towns in Spain connected to its own high-speed railway station, through the Sanabria AV.

Town hall
Palacios de Sanabria is home to the town hall of 4 villages:
Palacios de Sanabria (124 inhabitants, INE 2020).
Vime de Sanabria (65 inhabitants, INE 2020).
Otero de Sanabria (24 inhabitants, INE 2020).
Remesal de Sanabria (17 inhabitants, INE 2020).

References

Municipalities of the Province of Zamora